A museum label, also referred to as a caption or tombstone, is a label describing an object exhibited in a museum or one introducing a room or area.  Museum labels tend to list the artist's name, the artwork's name, the year the art was completed, and the materials used.  They may also include a summary, description, the years the artist lived, and the dimensions of the work.  When such labels are used in an art gallery setting they often also include the price of the artwork.
The first known museum labels are from Ennigaldi-Nanna's museum and date to circa 530 BCE. By the end of the 19th century, object labels, usually with less information than modern examples, had become standard in Western museums. Increasingly, labels in non-English-speaking countries have labels in English as well as the main local language, and in some parts of the world, labels in three or more languages are common.

References

External links
 

Label
Museology